Karen Botha (born 17 January 1967) is a South African athlete. She competed in the women's long jump at the 1992 Summer Olympics.

References

External links
 

1967 births
Living people
Athletes (track and field) at the 1992 Summer Olympics
South African female long jumpers
Olympic athletes of South Africa
Place of birth missing (living people)